Whole New Thing is a 2005 Canadian film directed by Amnon Buchbinder.

Whole New Thing may also refer to:

 A Whole New Thing (Sly and the Family Stone album)
 A Whole New Thing (Billy Preston album)